This national electoral calendar for the year 1999 lists the national/federal direct elections to be held in 1999 in the de jure and de facto sovereign states. By-elections are excluded, though national referendums are included.

January

February

March

April

May

June

July

August

September

October
 October 10 – The Socialist Party under António Guterres wins re-election to a second term in Portugal.

November
 November 27 – The Labour Party under Helen Clark becomes the new government in New Zealand.

December

National